José Alarcón Herrero (1878 – 11 March 1940) was a Spanish Socialist Workers' Party politician. He was a supporter of the Republican faction during the Spanish Civil War. After the victory of the Nationalists, he was executed by the Francoist State.

He was the romantic partner of socialist feminist writer María Cambrils.

References

Entrada de José Alarcón, en el Diccionario biográfico del socialismo español.
Entrada de María Cambrils, en el Diccionario biográfico del socialismo español.
María Cambrils, la famosa desconocida, El País, 9 de febrero de 2003.

1878 births
1940 deaths
Spanish Socialist Workers' Party politicians
People executed by Francoist Spain